

Champion
On April 9, 1975, at home in Selkirk, the Steelers won their second consecutive MJHL title, capturing the Turnbull Memorial Trophy. On April 16, 1975, in Swift Current, the Steelers beat the hometown Broncos of the Saskatchewan Junior Hockey League to win the Anavet Cup.

League notes
Jim Misener of the Dauphin Kings led the league in goals with 73, breaking Bobby Clarke's single season record of 71.

Regular season

Playoffs
Division Semi-Finals
Portage defeated Dauphin
St. James defeated St. Boniface 4-games-to-none 
Divisional Finals
Selkirk defeated Portage 4-games-to-1
West Kildonan defeated St. James 4-games-to-2
Turnbull Cup Championship
Selkirk defeated West Kildonan 4-games-to-3
Anavet Cup Championship
Selkirk defeated Swift Current Broncos (SJHL) 4-games-to-none
Abbott Cup Championship
Selkirk lost to Spruce Grove Mets (AJHL) 4-games-to-2

Awards

All-Star Teams

References
Manitoba Junior Hockey League
Manitoba Hockey Hall of Fame
Hockey Hall of Fame
Winnipeg Free Press Archives
Brandon Sun Archives

MJHL
Manitoba Junior Hockey League seasons